Ronald Cecil Graham Joy (30 July 1898 – 12 December 1974) was an English cricketer. A right-handed batsman and right-arm fast-medium bowler, he played for Essex between 1922 and 1928. His father-in-law Frank Penn played Test cricket for England in 1880.

Biography
Born in Colchester in 1898, Ronald Joy made his first-class debut for his native Essex against Worcestershire during the 1922 English cricket season. He did not play first-class cricket the following season, returning for three County Championship matches in 1924 and one match against Gloucestershire.

He didn't play at all for Essex in 1926 and 1927, instead playing first-class cricket for the British Army cricket team. He played against Cambridge University and the Navy in 1926, with those two along with Oxford University making up his opponents in 1927.

He played twice against the touring New Zealand national cricket team in the 1927 season, a first-class match for the Army and a non first-class match for HM Martineau's XI. He returned to Essex for the 1928 season, playing eight County Championship matches.

The remainder of his recorded cricket career was spent overseas. He played twice for Egypt against HM Martineau's XI in 1929, and played in the Madras Presidency Match in India in January 1930.

His last first-class match was for a Hyderabad Cricket Association XI against Aligarh University Past and Present in the semi-final of the Moin-ud-Dowlah Gold Cup Tournament in December 1931. He played twice more for Egypt against HM Martineau's XI in April 1936. He died in Norfolk in 1974.

References

1898 births
1974 deaths
Sportspeople from Colchester
Egyptian cricketers
English cricketers
Essex cricketers
Europeans cricketers
British Army cricketers
Hyderabad cricketers